Ramit Dhungana (Nepali: रमित ढुगााँना) is an actor who primarily works in Cinema of Nepal and made his debut with Rajesh Hamal through Maya Namara. He received National Film award for debutant of the year for the movie Maya Namara in 2003 and the Letter of Appreciation with promotion of Buddhism and peace by the Nepalese government in 2017.

Career 
Dhungana has worked in almost 100 films. Some of his movies are Maya Namara with Rajesh Hamal, Muglan with Dilip Rayamajhi, Dewar Babu with Biraj Bhatta, Dhadkan with Nikhil Upreti, and Jeevandata with Rajesh Hamal, Biraj Bhatta, and Jharana Thapa, and Himmat with Rekha Thapa.  He also acted in the movie Sundar with Deepak Raj Giri to spread awareness about autism. His most recent movie was Buddha Born in Nepal filmed in Cornell University to spread awareness about politics and education  His popularity is mainly in southeast Asia.  He is currently working on his latest movie Raja Saheb for 2021.

Filmography 

Most of the movies he has worked in are listed below.

Awards

References

External links 
 

Living people
1984 births
Nepalese actors